Mysterio is an album by Ian McCulloch, released 17 March 1992.  This was McCulloch's second solo album since his departure from Echo & the Bunnymen in 1989.  The album features a cover of the Leonard Cohen song "Lover, Lover, Lover," as  well as a guest appearance on the song "Heaven's Gate" by Elizabeth Fraser of the Cocteau Twins. The album reached number 46 on the UK Albums Chart and number 39 on Billboard's Top Heatseekers chart.

Track listing 
All tracks written by Ian McCulloch except where noted.

 "Magical World" – 4:10
 "Close Your Eyes" – 4:39
 "Dug for Love" – 3:50
 "Honeydrip" – 4:37
 "Damnation" – 3:18
 "Lover, Lover, Lover" (Leonard Cohen) – 3:55
 "Webbed" – 2:57
 "Pomegranate" – 4:22
 "Vibor Blue" – 2:59
 "Heaven's Gate" – 3:59
 "In My Head" – 5:05

Personnel 
 Ian McCulloch – vocals, guitar
 Steven Humphreys – drums
 John McEvoy – guitar
 Edgar Jones – bass
 Mike Mooney – lead guitar
Joe Gibb - percussion, trumpet
with:
Jono Podmore - electric violin on "Honey Drip" and "In My Head"
Roddy Frame - guitar on "Heaven's Gate"
 Elizabeth Fraser - backing vocals on "Heaven's Gate"
Lol Le Pop - backing vocals on "Close Your Eyes"
Sue Quin - backing vocals on "Dug for Love" and "Lover Lover Lover"
Technical
 Mark Saunders – producer ("Magical World", "Close Your Eyes", "Honeydrip", "Damnation", "Webbed", "Pomegranate" and "In My Head")
 Henry Priestman – producer ("Dug for Love" and "Lover, Lover, Lover")
 Robin Guthrie – producer ("Vibor Blue" and "Heaven's Gate")
Joe Gibb - engineer
Andrew Catlin - cover photography

References 

1992 albums
Ian McCulloch (singer) albums
Albums produced by Mark Saunders (record producer)
Albums produced by Robin Guthrie
Sire Records albums
East West Records albums